Steve Holt (born 1954) is a Canadian jazz pianist.

Early life and education
Born in Montreal, Quebec, in 1954, Holt exhibited musical ability in early childhood, playing piano at the age of four. By the time he was a teenager, Holt was a regular on the Montreal club scene.

Holt remained self-taught until he entered McGill University. There, he was taught by pianist Armas Maiste, whose bebop playing influenced him. Holt also became a student of Kenny Barron, traveling regularly to New York City for private lessons with the pianist. Holt graduated from McGill in 1981 with that university's first Bachelor of Music major in Jazz Performance, and taught jazz improvisation there.

Later life and career
In 1983, Holt's debut album, The Lion's Eyes, was released. It was nominated for a Juno Award. He has worked with jazz musicians Larry Coryell, Eddie Henderson, and Archie Shepp. Holt moved to Toronto in 1987 and worked as an equity analyst. For a time, he also continued playing clubs at night. Further albums were released in the 1990s: Christmas Light (1991); Just Duet (1992); and Catwalk (1994).

In 1999, Holt returned to concentrating on music full-time. Three years later, his fifth album, The Dream, was released. He then moved into music production, and stopped performing jazz live until 2014. Following a move to the countryside, his interest in jazz performance returned. In 2017, he opened a health food store in Warkworth, Ontario, that operates as a jazz venue once a week.

Discography 
 1983: The Lion's Eyes (Plug)
 1991: Christmas Light (Inner Music)
 1992: Just Duet (Sackville) with Kieran Overs
 1993: Catwalk (Sackville)
 2001: The Dream (Trilogy)

Singles
 2002: We Need You (Trilogy)
 2002: Just to Be With You (Trilogy)
 2003: Soon (Trilogy)

References

External links
 Official site

1954 births
Living people
Canadian jazz pianists
Musicians from Montreal
Post-bop pianists
Jewish Canadian musicians
Canadian jazz composers
Male jazz composers
McGill University School of Music alumni
Canadian pop pianists
Canadian singer-songwriters
Canadian male singers
Canadian financial analysts
Anglophone Quebec people
Canadian male pianists
21st-century Canadian pianists
21st-century Canadian male musicians
Sackville Records artists
Canadian male singer-songwriters